Keeva Keenan (born 16 August 1997) is an Irish international footballer who plays for Shelbourne of the Women's National League (WNL). She previously played for Scottish Women's Premier League (SWPL) clubs Celtic and Glasgow City, and for WNL clubs Raheny United and Shelbourne. She made her debut for the Republic of Ireland women's national football team in October 2019.

Club career

In January 2018, Keenan left Glasgow City for their local rivals Celtic. She was named club Player of the Year in her first season with the club. In 2020–21 she helped Celtic secure qualification to the UEFA Women's Champions League for the first time, but left the club at the end of the season. She agreed a return to Shelbourne in July 2021.

International career
On 5 May 2014, Republic of Ireland women's national football team manager Susan Ronan named Keenan in an experimental squad for a friendly against the Basque Country. Keenan did not feature in Ireland's 2–0 defeat in Azpeitia, which was not classified as a full international fixture.

Early in his reign as Ireland's national team coach, Colin Bell called-up Keenan for a friendly with Slovakia at Tallaght Stadium in April 2017. She remained an unused substitute in Ireland's 1–0 win and was subsequently "frozen out" by Bell.

In September 2019, Keenan was "in disbelief" to be called into the first senior squad to be named by Bell's successor Vera Pauw. She started Ireland's 3–2 win over Ukraine at Tallaght Stadium.

References

External links

Keeva Keenan at Football Association of Ireland (FAI)

1997 births
Living people
Republic of Ireland women's association footballers
Republic of Ireland women's international footballers
Glasgow City F.C. players
Association footballers from Dublin (city)
Republic of Ireland expatriate association footballers
Raheny United F.C. players
Women's National League (Ireland) players
Expatriate women's footballers in Scotland
Irish expatriate sportspeople in Scotland
Celtic F.C. Women players
Scottish Women's Premier League players
Women's association football defenders
Republic of Ireland women's youth international footballers